Beck v. Washington, 369 U.S. 541 (1962) is a United States Supreme Court case which ruled that intensive and voluminous news coverage in the vicinity where the defendant was indicted and tried did not violate the Due Process or Equal Protection Clauses of the Fourteenth Amendment.

References 

United States Supreme Court cases
United States Supreme Court cases of the Warren Court
1962 in United States case law
Grand Jury Clause case law